Dulcich is a surname. Notable people with the surname include:

Greg Dulcich (born 2000), American football player
Silvio Dulcich (born 1981), Argentine footballer